The Don may refer to:
 "The Don" (The View song)
 "The Don" (Nas song)
 Sir Donald Bradman or The Don, Australian cricketer
 Don Johnson, American actor (Miami Vice)
 Donald Trump, American President and businessman
 Don Dunstan, Australian politician.
 Don Matthews, Canadian Football League head coach
 The Don (1995 film)
 The Don (2006 film)
 The leader of a mafia crime family, especially the boss of a Sicilian Mafia family or Italian-American Mafia family.
 Don, Tasmania
 Don Caballero, a rock group from Pittsburgh, Pennsylvania

Rivers named Don
 Don River (disambiguation)